Alan D. Anyon (born 1931) is a British philatelist and expert in the revenue stamps of Colombia. In 2009, with Dieter Bortfeldt, he published the first dedicated catalogue of Colombian revenue stamps.

Philately
Alan Anyon has been a Fellow of The Royal Philatelic Society London since 2009. Apart from The Royal, Anyon is a member of several other philatelic societies including the Revenue Society, the Cinderella Stamp Club and the Colombia-Panama Philatelic Study Group (COPAPHIL). His displays of provisional and revenue stamps of Colombia have received eight gold medals worldwide and he has written over seventy articles on those subjects.

Outside philately
Now retired, Anyon was formerly a medical and chemical sales manager and served on the governing Council of the Royal Society for the Prevention of Cruelty to Animals (RSPCA) from 1995 until 2008. He was Deputy Treasurer of that society on two occasions. Anyon has been a member of his local branch of the RSPCA for almost 50 years.

Selected publications
Handbook of Colombian Revenue Stamps. Bogota, Colombia: COLOMPHIL, Colombian Philatelic Research Society, 2009. 
A different look at Colombia. Display given to The Royal Philatelic Society London 27 May 2010. London: The Royal Philatelic Society London, 2010. (With Dieter Bortfeldt)
"Colombia: The Postmaster's Provisional Issues." in The Cinderella Philatelist, Cinderella Stamp Club, Vol. 51, No. 2, April 2011, pp. 54–58. (Corrections in Vol. 51, No. 3, p. 118.)

See also
Revenue stamps of Colombia

References

External links
Alan Anyon presenting an RSPCA award in 2001.
Barranquilla: Private Post of Octavio Mora by Alan D. Anyon.

1931 births
British philatelists
Living people
Fellows of the Royal Philatelic Society London
Philately of Colombia
Place of birth missing (living people)